Koishi (written: 小石 lit "small stone") is a Japanese surname. Notable people with the surname include:

, Japanese baseball player
, Japanese photographer
, Japanese footballer
, Japanese footballer
, Japanese cyclist
, a character from Subterranean Animism, the 11th Touhou game

See also
Chichi Koishi, a 1951 Japanese film

Japanese-language surnames